Canoe Nunatak is a nunatak,  long and  wide, located  east-southeast of Mount Blackwelder, in the Wilkniss Mountains of Victoria Land. The distinctive shape resembles an upturned canoe. It was named by Alan Sherwood, New Zealand Geological Survey party leader in the area, 1987–88.

References 

Nunataks of Victoria Land
Scott Coast